The 2021 National Liberation Party Convention was the primary election process by which supporters of the National Liberation Party, the first opposition force in Costa Rica, selected their presidential candidate for the 2022 general elections. Former President José María Figueres was victorious.

Precedents
Antonio Álvarez Desanti, winner of the 2017 National Liberation Convention and therefore a candidate for the 2018 presidential elections, gave the party its worst electoral result in its history, obtaining 18% of the total votes in the first round, the lower percentage obtained by the group, as well as by not going to the second round for the first time in history.  In April 2021, Álvarez granted his adhesion to the former president of the Republic, José María Figueres Olsen.

Reforms
On December 12, 2020, the National Assembly of the National Liberation Party approved to carry out a series of reforms to its statute in view of the general elections of 2022, among them the reduction of the number of candidacies for deputation that the elected presidential candidate can choose going from four to one, and the approval to hold a convention with an open registry, instead of one with a closed registry and mandatory party affiliation as it was before. Likewise, June 6, 2021, was established as the date on which the National Liberation Convention would be held.

On March 9, 2021, the National Superior Executive Committee of the party published the registration fees for the internal election process, setting a quota of 29 million Costa Rican colones for the registration of each of the candidates.

Consensus candidacy
On February 20, 2021, the national media Amelia Rueda reported that the former president of the Republic, Óscar Arias Sánchez, had a conversation with the former presidents José María Figueres Olsen and Laura Chinchilla Miranda, in which he proposed that they will choose a presidential candidate by consensus for the National Liberation Party. The proposal consisted of each one proposing up to two names of possible candidates, and, from among them, the former presidents would choose a candidacy that should be ratified by the party's National Assembly. He would be informed later by President Chinchilla, for through an announcement on his official Twitter profile, and by President Figueres, through an interview, that they would not support the proposal of President Arias.

Óscar Arias, after the ex-presidents' rejection of his proposal, would propose the former vice president of the Republic in the Figueres Olsen administration, Rebeca Grynspan Mayufis, as his consensus candidate. However, the former vice president would reject the offer proposed by the former president.

Candidates

Registered

Retired

Discarded

 Laura Chinchilla Miranda, former president (endorsed Benavides).
 Óscar Arias Sánchez, former president.
 Gerardo Corrales Brenes, banker and entrepreneur.
 Rebeca Grynspan Mayufis, former Vice President.
 Rolando González Ulloa, former deputy.
 Rodrigo Arias Sánchez, former Minister of the Presidency (endorsed Benavides).

References

2021 in Costa Rica
Primary elections in Costa Rica